Étienne Périer (11 December 1931 – 21 June 2020) was a Belgian film director.

Filmography

Director
 1956 : Bernard Buffet
 1959 : , with Micheline Presle and François Périer
 1960 : Murder at 45 R.P.M., with Danielle Darrieux, Michel Auclair, Jean Servais
 1961 : Bridge to the Sun, with Carroll Baker and James Shigeta
 1962 : Swordsman of Siena, with Stewart Granger, Sylva Koscina and Christine Kaufmann
 1965 : Dis-moi qui tuer, with Michèle Morgan and Paul Hubschmid
 1967 : , with Nicole Garcia, Ludmila Mikaël, music from Jean Michel Jarre
 1968 : Hot Line, with Robert Taylor, Charles Boyer, George Chakiris, Marie Dubois
 1971 : When Eight Bells Toll, with Anthony Hopkins, Robert Morley, Nathalie Delon and Jack Hawkins
 1971 : Zeppelin, with Michael York and Elke Sommer
 1972 : , with Stéphane Audran, Michel Serrault, Robert Hossein and Jean-Claude Brialy
 1974 : , with Lea Massari, Michel Serrault, Michel Bouquet and Bernard Blier
 1978 : Fire's Share, with Claudia Cardinale, Michel Piccoli, Jacques Perrin
 1979 : Un si joli village, with Victor Lanoux and Jean Carmet
 1981 :  (TV), with Michel Piccoli as the professor and Pierre Malet as Roland
 1985 : La dérapade (TV), with Christophe Malavoy
 1985 : L'Ordre (TV), with Pierre Malet and Irina Brook
 1988 : La Garçonne (TV), with Marie Trintignant
 1989 : , with Vincent Spano, Victor Lanoux, Wojciech Pszoniak and Andréa Ferréol
 1991 : À la vie, à l'amour (TV)
 1993 : Maigret et l'homme du banc (TV)
 1993 : La Vérité en face (TV), with Claude Rich as Paul Noblet and Danielle Darrieux
 1994 : La Balle perdue (TV)
 1994 : Samson le magnifique (TV), with Charlotte Rampling as Isabelle de Marsac and Roger Hanin
 1997 : La Rumeur (TV)
 1998 : Le Dernier Fils (TV)
 2000 : Que reste-t-il... (TV), with Danielle Darrieux
 2004 : Table rase (TV), with Christophe Malavoy

Screenwriter
 Charming Boys (1957)

References

External links 
 

1931 births
2020 deaths
Belgian film directors